Oranda is an unincorporated community in Shenandoah County, Virginia United States.

Notable people
Leslie Coffelt, a Washington D.C. police officer who died for President Harry S. Truman during an assassination attempt

References

Unincorporated communities in Virginia
Unincorporated communities in Shenandoah County, Virginia